WJSJ-CD virtual channel 51 is a low-powered television station in Tipton, Indiana.

The station was formerly WIWU-CD, owned by Indiana Wesleyan University, until it was sold to Frank Copsidas in December 2020. As WIWU-CD, it aired local entertainment, sports, and news programming for Marion and Grant County, in addition to airing religious programming from TLN, Cornerstone Television and WHT. The sale came more than a year after Indiana Wesleyan University announced its intention to drop its broadcast operations and focus on digital services.

It was purchased by 5GTV, LLC, and is now broadcasting Paranormal TV.

References

Grant County, Indiana
JSJ-CD
Indiana Wesleyan University
Low-power television stations in the United States
Television channels and stations established in 1994
1994 establishments in Indiana